Earnings at risk (EaR) and the related cash flow at risk (CFaR) 

are measures reflecting the potential impact of market risk on the income statement and cash flow statement respectively, and hence the risk to the institution's return on assets and, ultimately, return on equity.
EaR measures the impact on net interest income due to movements in foreign exchange and interest rates; while CFaR measures possible shortfalls in cash flow due to these.
Both are calculated under simulation as for Value at Risk.

References 

Mathematical finance
Financial risk
Market risk
Monte Carlo methods in finance
Financial management